Tietomaa is a science centre in Oulu, Finland. It is located in Myllytulli district near the city centre. It is the first science centre in Finland and it was opened to the public on 29 June 1988.

Tietomaa is located in old buildings of the Veljekset Åström Oy, a former leather processing factory. The main exhibitions are located in the former power station. Tietomaa's  observation tower with a glass elevator outside the tower is a former water tower of the factory. Tietomaa also features a giant movie theatre, which at its opening was the first-ever purpose-built IMAX theatre in Finland and in the Nordic Countries. The IMAX system was replaced with a Barco 4K system in 2013.

References

External links
 
 

Museums in Oulu
Science centers
Science museums in Finland
Museums established in 1988
Myllytulli
1988 establishments in Finland